Building Giants is a British TV series covering the design and construction of large structures, including stadiums, tunnels, bridges, cruise ships, and other giant engineering feats that premiered in early 2018.

Broadcast History

The show first aired on the Science Channel in the U.S. on January 4, 2018 with the Stadium episode. Discovery Networks reported that along with Mega Machines, the series pushed Thursday ratings up 32% over January 2017. The series premiered on Channel 4 starting on April 16, 2018 beginning with the Venice episode.

On August 5, 2019, it was announced that the second season will premiere on August 7, 2019.

On May 4, 2020, it was announced that the third season will premiere on May 6, 2020.

Episode list

Season 1
 January 4	"World's Greatest Stadium"	Mercedes-Benz Stadium	in Atlanta, Georgia, United States
 January 11	"Monster Cruise Ship"	MSC Meraviglia	in Saint-Nazaire, Loire-Atlantique, France
 January 18	"Super Skyscraper NYC"	53W53 (MoMA Tower)	in New York, New York, United States
 January 25	"Arctic Mega Bridge"	Hålogaland Bridge	in Narvik, Nordland, Norway
 February 1	"World's Strongest Wall"	MOSE Project 	around Venice, Veneto, Italy
 February 8	"Monster Tunnel"	Copenhagen–Ringsted Line	on Zealand, Denmark
 February 15	"World's Tallest Church"	Sagrada Familia	in Barcelona, Catalonia, Spain
 February 22	"World's Toughest Skyscraper"	CITIC Tower (China Zun) 	in Beijing, China

The first episode was re-aired as "episode 9" (titled "Big Game Stadium") at the end of January 2019, just before the stadium hosted Super Bowl LIII.

References

External links
 
 Windfall Films Ltd. page
 TV Guide program page

Science Channel original programming
Science education television series
2018 American television series debuts